Thanks Maa is an India Hindi language drama film, directed by Irfan Kamal, distributed by Sony Pictures Entertainment India. The film focuses on child abandonment in India. It has been officially selected to be screened at Edinburgh International Film Festival, Pusan International Film Festival, Montreal World Film Festival, Cannes Film Festival, International Film Festival of India and Palm Springs International Film Festival. The debut child actor Master Shams Patel has also won the Best Child Artist for the film, in the 56th National Film Awards.

Plot 
A 12-year-old street kid named Municipality, while on the run from the reformatory, finds and saves a two-day-old abandoned child from being prey to a ferocious street dog. Failing to find any takers among the people he deemed responsible & respectable, Municipality takes up the onus of finding the child's mother himself. Here onwards ensues his struggle in the urban jungle of Mumbai with just four of his friends from the streets - Soda (15), Sursuri (10), Cutting (8), & Dhed-shaana (6).
 
Municipality's rock steady determination ultimately helps him emerge a winner against all odds as he reaches the child's mother. Though in the bargain, he loses his 'God like' &  flawless image of a mother he used to anticipate in his dreams. A mother, who he hoped, would come searching for him someday at the Municipality Hospital, where he was abandoned 12 years back.
 
The film ends showcasing some of the real-life issues of abandoned children and the misery they face in their day-to-day lives.

Cast 
Master Shams as Municipality Ghatkopar (W)
Master Salman as Soda
Master Fayyaz as Cutting
Baby Almas as Sursuri
Master Jaffer as Dhed-Shaana
Baby Sakshi as Krish
Alok Nath as Warden of the Reformatory
Raghubir Yadav as Peon of the Municipality Hospital
Barry John as Priest at the Church
Sanjay Mishra as The Cab Driver
Ranvir Shorey as  Mr.Motwani
Mukta Barve as Lakshmi The Prostitute
Jalees Sherwani as Head Eunuch
Bikramjeet Kanwarpal
Subrat Dutta
Balkrishna Shinde as Tatya langada
Ayesha Raza as Motwani's wife.
Rasika Dugal as Krish's biological mother.
Yatin Karyekar as Krish's biological father.
Rukhsar Rehman as Municipality's biological mother.

References

External links
 

Sony Pictures films
Columbia Pictures films
Sony Pictures Networks India films
2010s Hindi-language films
2010 films
Films set in Mumbai
2010 directorial debut films